= TeeKay-421 =

Belgian Star Wars fanclub

TeeKay-421 is the smallest Belgian Star Wars Fanclub founded in 1997 by Christiaan Vertez, Laurent Bettens, and Tim Veekhoven.

TeeKay publishes four TeeKay-421 magazines a year (articles, interviews, reviews), organizes club meetings and contests, runs a website, and has held several charity actions. The magazine and website are in Dutch.

== History ==
Founded in 1997, TeeKay became a non-profit organization in 1998. TeeKay's website won the 1999 award of best non-professional website in Belgium.
